Banjalučka pivara or Banja Luka Brewery is a Bosnian brewing company based in Banja Luka, Bosnia and Herzegovina, the country's second-largest city. The company was founded as part of activities by the Trappist order in the village of Delibaša. After World War II the brewery was nationalized and in 1975 included in newly founded company "Bosanska Krajina".

145 years ago, in a small place beside Banja Luka, beside the Vrbas grove, a brave little Banja Luka brewery was created by the work of a trappist monk from the Marija Zvijezda monastery. The founder of this small brewery was Franz Pfanner, the leader of the Trappist Order in Banja Luka, who together with other monks, besides the brewery, also established a cheese factory to produce the famous Trappista cheese, as well as one of the first power plants in Europe, adhering to his modest lifestyle and chore "Pray and work" ("Ora et labora").

Brands

Nektar Pivo, lager beer
Nektar Limun, shandy with flavour of lemon
Nektar Grejp, shandy with flavour of grapefruit
Nektar Crveni Grejp, shandy with flavour of red grapefruit
Banjalučko pivo, lager beer
Kaltenberg pivo, royal Bavaria beer
Crni Đorđe pivo, dark beer named after Karađorđe
Kastel pivo, lager

References

External links
 

Beer in Bosnia and Herzegovina
Companies based in Banja Luka
Food and drink companies established in 1873
Brands of Bosnia and Herzegovina